My Passion // Your Pain  is the fourth studio album by the melodic death metal band Callenish Circle.

Track listing
 "Soul Messiah" − 3:54
 "Dwelling in Disdain" − 4:10
 "Forsaken" − 4:55
 "What Could Have Been..." − 7:13
 "This Truculent Path" − 5:06
 "My Hate Unfolds" − 7:07
 "Misled" − 5:11
 "My Passion //" − 2:25
 "Conflicts" − 0:56
 "// Your Pain" − 4:22
 "Out of the Body" (Pestilence cover) − 4:37

Credits

Music
 Patrick Savelkoul − vocals
 Ronny Tyssen − guitar
 Remy Dieteren − guitar
 Gavin Harte − drums
 Rene Rokx − bass
 Gail Liebling − background vocals
 Kaleen − female voices

Production
 Mixed by Andy Classen, Patrick Savelkoul, Ronny Tyssen and Gavin Harte.
 Mastered by Peter Neuber.
 Cover artwork by Niklas Sundin.

2003 albums
Callenish Circle albums
Albums produced by Andy Classen